Kedoshim, K'doshim, or Qedoshim ( — Hebrew for "holy ones," the 14th word, and the first distinctive word, in the parashah) is the 30th weekly Torah portion (parashah) in the annual Jewish cycle of Torah reading and the seventh in the Book of Leviticus. It constitutes . The parashah tells of the laws of holiness and ethical behavior, repeats the ten commandments, and describes penalties for sexual transgressions. The parashah is made up of 3,229 Hebrew letters, 868 Hebrew words, 64 verses, and 109 lines in a Torah Scroll (Sefer Torah).

Jews generally read it in late April or May. The lunisolar Hebrew calendar contains up to 55 weeks, the exact number varying between 50 in common years and 54 or 55 in leap years. In leap years (for example, 2022 and 2024), parashah Kedoshim is read separately. In common years (for example, 2020, 2021, 2023, 2025, and 2026), parashah Kedoshim is combined with the previous parashah, Acharei Mot, to help achieve the needed number of weekly readings. And in the standard Reform High Holidays prayerbook (machzor), 9–18, and 32–37 are the Torah readings for the afternoon Yom Kippur service.

Kodashim is the name of the fifth order in the Mishnah, Tosefta, and Babylonian Talmud. The term "kedoshim" is sometimes also used to refer to the six million Jews murdered during the Holocaust, whom some call "kedoshim" because they fulfilled the mitzvah of Kiddush Hashem.

Readings

First reading — Leviticus 19:1–14
In the first reading (aliyah), God told Moses to tell the Israelites to be holy, for God is holy. God then explained (in what scholars call "the Holiness Code") how people can be holy. God instructed the Israelites:
To revere their mothers and fathers
To keep the Sabbath
Not to turn to idols
To eat the sacrifice of well-being in the first two days and burn all of the leftovers on the third day
Not to reap all the way to the edges of a field, but to leave some for the poor and the stranger
Not to steal, deceive, swear falsely, or defraud
To pay laborers their wages promptly
Not to insult the deaf or impede the blind

Second reading — Leviticus 19:15–22
In the second reading (aliyah), God instructed the Israelites:
To judge fairly
Not to deal basely with their countrymen, profit by their blood, or hate them in their hearts
To reprove kinsmen but incur no guilt because of them
Not to take vengeance or bear a grudge
To love others as oneself
I am the Lord.
Not to interbreed different species or sow fields with two kinds of seed
Not to wear cloth from a mixture of two kinds of material
A man who had sexual relations with a slave woman designated for another man had to offer a ram of guilt offering.

Third reading — Leviticus 19:23–32
In the third reading (aliyah), God instructed the Israelites:
To regard the fruit of a newly planted tree as forbidden for three years, set aside for God in the fourth year, and available to use in the fifth year
Not to eat anything with its blood
Not to practice divination or soothsaying
Not to round off the side-growth on their heads or destroy the side-growth of their beards
Not to gash their flesh for the dead
Not to degrade their daughters or make them harlots
To venerate God's sanctuary
Not to turn to ghosts or inquire of spirits
To rise before the aged and show deference to the old

Fourth reading — Leviticus 19:33–37
In the fourth reading (aliyah), God instructed the Israelites:
Not to wrong strangers who reside in the land, but to love them as oneself
Not to falsify weights or measures

Fifth reading — Leviticus 20:1–7
In the fifth reading (aliyah), God then told Moses to instruct the Israelites of the following penalties for transgressions.

The following were to be put to death:
One who gave a child to Molech

The following were to be cut off from their people (karet):
One who turned to ghosts or familiar spirits

Sixth reading — Leviticus 20:8–22
In the sixth reading (aliyah), God told Moses to instruct the Israelites of the following penalties for transgressions.

The following were to be put to death:
One who insulted his father or mother
A man who committed adultery with a married woman, and the married woman with whom he committed it
A man who lay with his father's wife, and his father wife with whom he lay
A man who lay with his daughter-in-law, and his daughter-in-law with whom he lay
A man who lay with a male as one lies with a woman, and the male with whom he lay
A man who married a woman and her mother, and the woman and mother whom he married
A man who had carnal relations with a beast, and the beast with whom he had relations
A woman who approached any beast to mate with it, and the beast that she approached
One who had a ghost or a familiar spirit

The following were to be cut off from their people (karet):
A man who married his sister, and the sister whom he married
A man who lay with a woman in her infirmity, and the woman with whom he lay

The following were to die childless:
A man who uncovered the nakedness of his aunt, and the aunt whose nakedness he uncovered
A man who married his brother's wife, and the brother's wife whom he married

God then enjoined the Israelites faithfully to observe all God's laws, lest the Promised Land spew them out.

Seventh reading — Leviticus 20:23–27
In the seventh reading (aliyah), God made clear that it was because the land's former inhabitants did all these things that God dispossessed them. God designated the Israelites as holy to God, for God is holy, and God had set the Israelites apart from other peoples to be God's.

Readings according to the triennial cycle
Jews who read the Torah according to the triennial cycle of Torah reading read the parashah according to a different schedule.

In ancient parallels
The parashah has parallels in these ancient sources:

Leviticus chapter 20
Figs were in it and grapes. It had more wine than water. Abundant was its honey, plentiful its oil. All kind of fruit were on its trees. Barley was there and emmer, and no end of cattle of all kinds."

In inner-biblical interpretation
The parashah has parallels or is discussed in these Biblical sources:

Leviticus chapter 19
In , God told Moses to tell the Israelites, “You shall be holy; for I the Lord your God am holy.” Professor David P. Wright of Brandeis University counted more than 850 instances of the three-letter Hebrew root denoting holiness (kdsh) as a verb, noun, or adjective in the Hebrew Bible (Tanakh). Professor Larry A. Mitchel, formerly of Pacific Union College, counted 430 instances of “holy” (kodesh) as an adjective or noun, 172 instances of the verb “be holy” or “consecrate” (kadash), 115 instances of “holy” (kadosh) as an adjective, and 11 instances of the adjective “consecrated” or noun “cult prostitute” (kadesh). Wright noted that the Hebrew Bible describes as “holy” God, lesser divine beings, Priests, the Israelite people, Nazirites, Levites, firstborn people, prophets, the Sanctuary, offerings, Sanctuary furnishings, Priestly clothing, property dedicated to the Priests, anointing oil, incense, certain water, the Land of Israel, Heaven, the Sabbath, Festivals, the Jubilee year, certain wars, and the Covenant.

Professors Tamara Cohn Eskenazi of the Hebrew Union College-Jewish Institute of Religion and Tikva Frymer-Kensky of the University of Chicago Divinity School argued that Ruth enacted the love due to the stranger in  when in Moab, Ruth devoted herself to Naomi, a stranger in Moab. Then Boaz provided her counterpart by making possible the inclusion of Ruth the Moabite in the community at Bethlehem.

Leviticus chapter 20
 addresses God's role in the creation of children.

 announced the judgment that those who gave their children to Molech profaned God's Name. In , Amos similarly condemned as profaning God's Name fathers and sons who had sex with the same woman — likely exploiting a household servant woman. Amos grouped these sinners in the same verse along with those who trample the heads of the poor into the dust and those who make the humble walk a twisted course, thereby suggesting more generally that those who take advantage of people in lower social stations profane God's Name.

In early nonrabbinic interpretation
The parashah has parallels or is discussed in these early nonrabbinic sources:

Leviticus chapter 20
Professor Lawrence Schiffman of New York University noted that this was a point of contention between the Pharisees and other Jewish groups in Second Temple times.

In classical rabbinic interpretation
The parashah is discussed in these rabbinic sources from the era of the Mishnah and the Talmud:

Leviticus chapter 19

Similarly, God twice exhorted the Israelites to holiness, because the Evil Inclination sways people like drunkards, whereas the Evil Inclination does not exist among celestial beings. Similarly, Rabbi Abin likened the two exhortations to holiness to the case of the citizens who made three crowns for the king, and the king placed one on his own head and two on the heads of his sons. God then places one crown of holiness on God's own head and two crowns of holiness on the head of Israel.

And Rabbi Levi said it was because it includes each of the Ten Commandments, noting that: (1)  says, "I am the Lord your God," and  says, "I am the Lord your God"; (2)  says, "You shall have no other gods," and  says, "Nor make to yourselves molten gods"; (3)  (20:7 in NJPS) says, "You shall not take the name of the Lord your God in vain," and  says, "And you shall not swear by My name falsely"; (4)  (20:8 in NJPS) says, "Remember the Sabbath day," and  says, "And you shall keep My Sabbaths"; (5)  (20:12 in NJPS) says, "Honor your father and your mother," and  says, "You shall fear every man his mother, and his father"; (6)  (20:13 in NJPS) says, "You shall not murder," and  says, "Neither shall you stand idly by the blood of your neighbor"; (7)  (20:13 in NJPS) says, "You shall not commit adultery," and  says, "Both the adulterer and the adulteress shall surely be put to death; (8)  (20:13 in NJPS) says, "You shall not steal," and  says, "You shall not steal"; (9)  (20:13 in NJPS) says, "You shall not bear false witness," and  says, "You shall not go up and down as a talebearer"; and (10)  (20:14 in NJPS) says, "You shall not covet . . . anything that is your neighbor's," and  says, "You shall love your neighbor as yourself."

Rabbi Shimon noted that everywhere else, Scripture mentions a father's honor before the mother's honor. But  mentions the mother first to teach that one should honor both parents equally. The Sages, however, said that the father comes before the mother in all places, because both the son and the mother are bound to honor the father.

It was taught in a Baraita that Rabbi said that God knows that a son honors his mother more than his father, because the mother wins him over with words. God knows that a son fears his father more than his mother, because the father teaches him Torah. Therefore, (in ) God put the fear of the mother before that of the father.

Noting that as  commands, "You shall fear your father and mother," and  commands, "The Lord your God you shall fear and you shall serve," the Rabbis taught in a Baraita that Scripture likens the fear of parents to the fear of God. As  (20:12 in NJSP) commands, "Honor your father and your mother," and  directs, "Honor the Lord with your substance," Scripture likens the honor due to parents to that due to God. And as  commands, "He that curses his father or his mother shall surely be put to death," and  commands, "Whoever curses his God shall bear his sin," Scripture likens cursing parents to cursing God. But the Baraita conceded that with respect to striking (which  addresses with regard to parents) that it is certainly impossible (with respect to God). The Baraita concluded that these comparisons between parents and God are only logical, since the three (God, the mother, and the father) are partners in creation of the child. For the Rabbis taught in a Baraita that there are three partners in the creation of a person — God, the father, and the mother. When one honors one's father and mother, God considers it as if God had dwelt among them and they had honored God. And a Tanna taught before Rav Nachman that when one vexes one's father and mother, God considers it right not to dwell among them, for had God dwelt among them, they would have vexed God.

A Midrash asked to which commandment  refers when it says, "For if you shall diligently keep all this commandment that I command you, to do it, to love the Lord your God, to walk in all His ways, and to cleave to Him, then will the Lord drive out all these nations from before you, and you shall dispossess nations greater and mightier than yourselves." Rabbi Levi said that "this commandment" refers to the recitation of the Shema, but the Rabbis said that it refers to the Sabbath, which is equal to all the precepts of the Torah.

The Alphabet of Rabbi Akiva taught that when God was giving Israel the Torah, God told them that if they accepted the Torah and observed God's commandments, then God would give them for eternity a most precious thing that God possessed — the World To Come. When Israel asked to see in this world an example of the World To Come, God replied that the Sabbath is an example of the World To Come.

The Mishnah taught that the Torah defines no minimum or maximum for the donation of the corners of one's field to the poor. But the Mishnah also taught that one should not make the amount left to the poor less than one-sixtieth of the entire crop. And even though no definite amount is given, the amount given should accord with the size of the field, the number of poor people, and the extent of the yield.

Rabbi Eliezer taught that one who cultivates land in which one can plant a quarter kav of seed is obligated to give a corner to the poor. Rabbi Joshua said land that yields two seah of grain. Rabbi Tarfon said land of at least six handbreadths by six handbreadths. Rabbi Judah ben Betera said land that requires two strokes of a sickle to harvest, and the law is as he spoke. Rabbi Akiva said that one who cultivates land of any size is obligated to give a corner to the poor and the first fruits.

The Mishnah taught that the poor could enter a field to collect three times a day — in the morning, at midday, and in the afternoon. Rabban Gamliel taught that they said this only so that landowners should not reduce the number of times that the poor could enter. Rabbi Akiva taught that they said this only so that landowners should not increase the number of times that the poor had to enter. The landowners of Beit Namer used to harvest along a rope and allowed the poor to collect a corner from every row.

The Mishnah taught that one who does not allow the poor to glean, or who allows one and not another, or who helps only one, is stealing from the poor. The Mishnah taught that  speaks of this when it says, “Do not encroach upon the border of those who go up.”

The Gemara noted that  includes a superfluous term “by reaping” and reasoned that this must teach that the obligation to leave for the poor applies to crops that the owner uproots as well as to crops that the owner cuts. And the Gemara reasoned that the superfluous words “When you reap” in  teach that the obligation also extends to one who picks a crop by hand.

And for those who do not give to the poor, it is accounted to them as if the Temple existed and they did not offer up their sacrifices in it.

The Mishnah taught that one who left a basket under the vine when harvesting grapes was stealing from the poor. The Mishnah said that  speaks of this when it says, “Do not withdraw the border of those who go up.”

If the cluster had a shoulder or a dangling portion, it belonged to the property owner, but if there was a doubt, it belonged to the poor. A cluster that was attached to the joint between branches or the stem and the trunk, if it was plucked with the grape cluster, it belonged to the property owner; if not, it belonged to the poor. Rabbi Judah said that a single-grape cluster was a cluster, but the Sages said that it was a defective cluster (and thus belonged to the poor).

The Mishnah taught that after the weakest of the poor had come and gone, everyone (regardless of poverty or wealth) was permitted to take individual stalks that fell during harvest (leket — which had to be left for the poor to glean).

The Gemara harmonized the two positions by concluding that Rabbi Josiah referred to the prohibition for abduction, while Rabbi Johanan referred to the prohibition for selling a kidnapped person. Similarly, the Rabbis taught in a Baraita that  (20:13 in the NJPS), "You shall not steal," refers to the stealing of human beings. To the potential objection that  (20:13 in the NJPS) refers to property theft, the Baraita responded that one of the thirteen principles by which we interpret the Torah is that a law is interpreted by its general context, and the Ten Commandments speak of capital crimes (like murder and adultery). (Thus "You shall not steal" must refer to a capital crime and thus to kidnapping.) Another Baraita taught that the words "You shall not steal" in  refer to theft of property. To the potential objection that  refers to the theft of human beings, the Baraita responded that the general context of  speaks of money matters; therefore  must refer to monetary theft.

If engaged by the night, the worker could collect the wages all of the following day. If engaged by the hour, the worker could collect the wages all that day and night. If engaged by the week, month, year, or 7-year period, if the worker's time expired during the day, the worker could collect the wages all that day. If the worker's time expired during the night, the worker could collect the wages all that night and the following day.

The Mishnah taught that the hire of persons, animals, or utensils were all subject to the law of  that "in the same day you shall give him his hire" and the law of  that "the wages of a hired servant shall not abide with you all night until the morning." The employer became liable only when the worker or vendor demanded payment from the employer. Otherwise, the employer did not infringe the law. If the employer gave the worker or vendor a draft on a shopkeeper or a money changer, the employer complied with the law. A worker who claimed the wages within the set time could collect payment if the worker merely swore that the employer had not yet paid. But if the set time had passed, the worker's oath was insufficient to collect payment. Yet if the worker had witnesses that the worker had demanded payment (within the set time), the worker could still swear and receive payment.

The Mishnah taught that the employer of a resident alien was subject to the law of  that "in the same day you shall give him his hire" (as  refers to the stranger), but not to the law of  that "the wages of a hired servant shall not abide with you all night until the morning."

The Mishnah taught that one who pursues a neighbor with intent to kill must be saved from sin even at the cost of the pursuer's life. The Gemara also cited  for a Baraita that taught that one is obligated to try to save another whom one sees drowning in a river, or being dragged away by a wild animal, or being attacked by bandits. The Gemara further taught that the verse “Do not stand by the blood of another” teaches that one must even hire others to help rescue a person one sees to be jeopardy, and one transgresses a prohibition if one does not do so.

In a Baraita, the Rabbis reasoned that had  said simply, "You shall not hate your brother," one might have believed that one should simply not smite, slap, or curse him; therefore  states "in your heart" to cover intentions as well as actions. Scripture speaks of hatred in the heart.

A Midrash catalogued the wide range of additional capabilities of the heart reported in the Hebrew Bible. The heart speaks, sees, hears, walks, falls, stands, rejoices, cries, is comforted, is troubled, becomes hardened, grows faint, grieves, fears, can be broken, becomes proud, rebels, invents, cavils, overflows, devises, desires, goes astray, lusts, is refreshed, can be stolen, is humbled, is enticed, errs, trembles, is awakened, loves, envies, is searched, is rent, meditates, is like a fire, is like a stone, turns in repentance, becomes hot, dies, melts, takes in words, is susceptible to fear, gives thanks, covets, becomes hard, makes merry, acts deceitfully, speaks from out of itself, loves bribes, writes words, plans, receives commandments, acts with pride, makes arrangements, and aggrandizes itself.

Rabbi Samuel bar Rav Isaac said that Rav said that one is permitted to hate another whom one sees committing a sin, as  states: "If you see the donkey of he who hates you lying under its load." But the Gemara asked whether one is permitted to hate one's fellow, as  says, “You shall not hate your brother in your heart,” which prohibits hating one's fellow. The Gemara concluded that one is permitted to hate another for evil behavior one sees, whereas others who are unaware of these actions may not hate the other. Rav Naḥman bar Isaac said: Not only is this permitted, it is even a commandment to hate this other person, as  states: "The fear of God is to hate evil."

In a Baraita, the Rabbis deduced from the command in  that "you shall surely rebuke your neighbor" that one is obliged to reprove a neighbor whom one observes doing something wrong. And they deduced from the emphatic words "you shall surely rebuke" that if one has rebuked one's neighbor and the neighbor does not accept the rebuke, then one must rebuke the neighbor again. But the Rabbis deduced that  continues to say "you shall not bear sin because of him" to teach that one should not rebuke a neighbor to the neighbor's embarrassment.

Rabbi Jose ben Hanina said that love unaccompanied by reproof is not love. And Resh Lakish taught that reproof leads to peace, and thus (as  reports) "Abraham reproved Abimelech." Resh Lakish said that peace unaccompanied by reproof is not peace.

The Gemara concluded that all everyone is held responsible for each another. Thus the Gemara taught that all Jews stand as guarantors for one another. And reading , "I went down into the garden of nuts," to apply to Israel, a Midrash taught that just as when one takes a nut from a stack of nuts, all the rest come toppling over, so if a single Jew is smitten, all Jews feel it, as  says, "Shall one man sin, and will You be angry with all the congregation?"

Rabbi Tarfon wondered whether anyone in his generation could accept reproof, for if one told another, "Remove the mote from between your eyes," the other would answer, "Remove the beam from between your eyes!" Rabbi Eleazar ben Azariah wondered whether anyone in his generation knew how to reprove. Rabbi Johanan ben Nuri said that he would often complain about Akiva to Rabban Gamaliel Beribbi, causing Akiva to be punished as a result, but Akiva all the more showered love upon Rabbi Johanan ben Nuri, bearing out what  says: "Reprove not a scorner, lest he hate you; reprove a wise man, and he will love you."

Rabbi Judah the son of Rabbi Simeon ben Pazzi asked his father whether it was preferable to reprove honestly or to forgo reproof out of false modesty. Rabbi Simeon answered that restraint out of true modesty is better still, for a Master said modesty is greatest of all. Thus false modesty is also preferable, he reasoned, for Rav Judah said in the name of Rav that one should engage in Torah study and good deeds, even if not for their own sake, because through doing good for an ulterior motive one will come to do good for its own sake. To illustrate honest reproof and forbearance out of false modesty, the Gemara told how Rav Huna and Ḥiyya bar Rav were sitting before Samuel, when Ḥiyya bar Rav complained about how Rav Huna was bothering him. Rav Huna undertook not to bother Ḥiyya bar Rav anymore. After Ḥiyya bar Rav left, Rav Huna told Samuel how Ḥiyya bar Rav had done this and that wrong thing. So Samuel asked Rav Huna why he had not told Ḥiyya bar Rav to his face. Rav Huna replied that he did not want to put the son of Rav to shame (and thus chose insincere forbearance over honest rebuke).

The Gemara discussed how far one should reprove another. Rav said that one should reprove until the one reproved strikes the reprover. Samuel said that one should reprove until the one reproved curses the reprover. Rabbi Johanan said that one should reprove only until the one reproved rebukes the reprover. The Gemara noted a similar dispute among Tannaim. Rabbi Eliezer said until the one reproved strikes the reprover. Rabbi Joshua said until the one reproved curses the reprove. Ben Azzai said until the one reproved rebukes the reprover. Rav Naḥman bar Isaac said that all three cited  to support their positions.  says: "Then Saul's anger was kindled against Jonathan and he said to him: ‘You son of perverse rebellion, do not I know that you have chosen the son of Jesse (David) to your own shame, and to the shame of your mother's nakedness?'" And shortly thereafter,  says: "And Saul cast his spear at him to smite him." Rabbi Eliezer said "until the one reproved strikes" because  says "to smite him." Rabbi Joshua said "until the one reproved curses" because  says: "to your own shame and to the shame of your mother's nakedness." Ben Azzai said "until the one reproved rebukes" because  says: "Then Saul's anger was kindled." The Gemara asked how Ben Azzai, who said "until the one reproved rebukes," explained how  also mentions beating and cursing. The Gemara reasoned that Jonathan risked his life even further (and rebuked even more than required) because of his great love of David.

Rabbi Nathan cautioned, however, that one should not reprove another about a fault that one has oneself. Thus the proverb runs: If there is a case of hanging in a person's family record, one should not even ask that person to hang up a fish.

And Rabbi Il'a said in the name of Rabbi Eleazar son of Rabbi Simeon that just as one is obliged to say words of reproof that will be accepted, so one is obliged not to say words of reproof that will not be accepted. Rabbi Abba said that it is a duty to forgo reproof that will not be accepted, as  says: "Reprove not a scorner, lest he hate you; reprove a wise man, and he will love you."

The Sifra taught that the term "vengeance" applies to a case where one person asks to borrow a second's sickle, and the second does not lend it, and then on the next day, the second asks the first to borrow the first's spade, and the first declines to lend it because the second did not lend the second's sickle. The Sifra taught that the term "grudge" applies to a case where one person asks to borrow a second's spade, and the second does not lend it, and then on the next day, the second asks the first to borrow the first's sickle, and the first consents to lend the sickle but taunts, "I am not like you, for you did not lend me your spade, but here, take the sickle!"

The Gemara answered: If one was cutting meat, and the knife in one hand cut the other hand, would the person then go and cut the hand that held the knife?

Once a gentile came before Shammai and said, "I will convert to Judaism, on the condition that you teach me the whole Torah while I stand on one foot." Shammai pushed him away with a builder's ruler. When the gentile repeated his challenge before Hillel, Hillel said to him (paraphrasing ), "What is hateful to you, do not do to your fellow. That is the whole Torah, and the rest is the explanation — go and learn it."

Hence, one must not say, "Since I have been put to shame, let my neighbor be put to shame." And Rabbi Tanhuma taught that those who do so must know Whom they put to shame, for  reports of humankind, "In the likeness of God made He him."

The Gemara reported that a dilemma was raised before the Sages: Could a child operate on his parent? Would the child thus be liable for wounding the parent? Rav Mattana quoted , "And you shall love your neighbor as yourself," and reasoned that just as people would want others to heal them when the need arises, they must heal others when the need arises. It is prohibited for one to do to others only those actions that one would not want done to oneself. Therefore, it is permitted for one to heal a parent even if the procedure entails wounding the parent.

Rav Naḥman said in the name of Rabbah bar Abbuha that  requires that even when executing a person, one must choose for the condemned an easy death.

And other Rabbis counseled that  prohibits taking actions that would make one's spouse unattractive. Thus Rav Judah said in the name of Rav that  requires a man not to become engaged to a woman before he sees her, lest he subsequently see something in her that might make her repulsive to him. Similarly, Rav Hisda taught that  prohibited one from engaging in marital relations during the daytime, and Abaye explained that this was because one might observe something that should make one's spouse repulsive.

Reading , "My ordinances (mishpatai) shall you do, and My statutes (chukotai) shall you keep," the Rabbis in a Baraita taught that the "ordinances" (mishpatim) were commandments that logic would have dictated that we follow even had Scripture not commanded them, like the laws concerning idolatry, adultery, bloodshed, robbery, and blasphemy.

So one should separate from transgression and accept the rule of Heaven.

One could (1) plow with an ox and a donkey yoked together (in violation of ) (2 and 3) that are two animals dedicated to the sanctuary, (4) plowing mixed seeds sown in a vineyard (in violation of ), (5) during a Sabbatical year (in violation of ), (6) on a Festival-day (in violation of, for example), (7) when the plower is a priest (in violation of ) and (8) a Nazirite (in violation of ) plowing in a contaminated place. They said to him that this would not be in the same category as the other violations. He replied that neither is the Nazirite in the same category as the other violations.

Tractate Orlah in the Mishnah, Tosefta, and Jerusalem Talmud interpreted the laws of the prohibition in  against using the fruits of a tree in its first three years.

Rav Zeira taught that all the nations are uncircumcised in each of the first four ways, and all the house of Israel are uncircumcised in heart, in that their hearts do not allow them to do God's will. And Rav Zeira taught that in the future, God will take away from Israel the uncircumcision of their hearts, and they will not harden their stubborn hearts anymore before their Creator, as  says, "And I will take away the stony heart out of your flesh, and I will give you an heart of flesh," and  says, "And you shall be circumcised in the flesh of your foreskin."

The Mishnah taught that the commandments of  not to round off the side-growth of one's head and not to destroy the corners of one's beard are two of only three exceptions to the general rule that every commandment that is a prohibition (whether time-dependent or not) governs both men and women.

Rabbi Eliezer the Great taught that the Torah warns against wronging a stranger in 36, or others say 46, places (including ).

But a Midrash noted that  already mentioned judgment in law, and questioned why  would state the same proposition again and why  uses the words, "in judgment, in measures." The Midrash deduced that  teaches that a person who measures is called a judge, and one who falsifies measurements is called by the five names "unrighteous," "hated," "repulsive," "accursed," and an "abomination," and is the cause of these five evils. Rabbi Banya said in the name of Rav Huna that the government comes and attacks that generation whose measures are false. Reading , "Shall I be pure with wicked balances?" Rabbi Berekiah said in the name of Rabbi Abba that it is impossible for a generation whose measures are false to be meritorious, for  continues, "And with a bag of deceitful weights" (showing that their holdings would be merely illusory). Rabbi Levi taught that Moses also hinted to Israel that a generation with false measures would be attacked.  warns, "You shall not have in your bag diverse weights . . . you shall not have in your house diverse measures."

Leviticus chapter 20

The Mishnah asked about the command of  that the animal be killed: If the person had sinned, in what way did the animal sin? The Mishnah concluded that Scripture ordered it killed because it enticed the person to sin. Alternatively, the Mishnah explained that the animal was killed so that it should not pass through the streets provoking people to say, "This is the animal on account of which so and so was stoned."

Once when Rami bar Ezekiel visited Bnei Brak, he saw goats grazing under fig trees while honey was flowing from the figs, and milk dripped from the goats mingling with the fig honey, causing him to remark that it was indeed a land flowing with milk and honey. Rabbi Jacob ben Dostai said that it is about three miles from Lod to Ono, and once he rose up early in the morning and waded all that way up to his ankles in fig honey. Resh Lakish said that he saw the flow of the milk and honey of Sepphoris extend over an area of sixteen miles by sixteen miles. Rabbah bar Bar Hana said that he saw the flow of the milk and honey in all the Land of Israel and the total area was equal to an area of twenty-two parasangs by six parasangs.

In medieval Jewish interpretation
The parashah is discussed in these medieval Jewish sources:

Leviticus chapter 19

Reading , "Do not hate your brother in your heart," Maimonides taught that whoever hates a fellow Jew in his heart transgresses a Torah prohibition. Maimonides taught that when someone wrongs you, you should not remain silent and despise that person. Rather, you must make the matter known and ask the person: "Why did you do this to me?" "Why did you wrong me regarding that matter?" as  states: "You shall surely admonish your colleague." If, afterwards, the person who committed the wrong asks you to forgive, you must do so. One should not be cruel when forgiving. Maimonides taught that it is a commandment for a person who sees that a fellow Jew has sinned or is following an improper path to attempt to correct the other's behavior and to inform the other, as  states: "You shall surely admonish your colleague." A person who rebukes a colleague — whether because of a wrong committed against the person or because of a matter between the colleague and God — should rebuke the colleague privately. The person should speak to the colleague patiently and gently, informing the colleague that the person is only making these statements for the colleague's own welfare, to allow the colleague to merit the life of the World to Come. If the colleague accepts the rebuke, it is good; if not, the person should rebuke the colleague a second and third time. Indeed, you are obligated to rebuke a colleague who does wrong until the colleague strikes you and tells you: "I will not listen." Whoever has the possibility of rebuking sinners and fails to do so is considered responsible for the sin, for the person had the opportunity to rebuke the sinners. Maimonides taught that at first, a person who admonishes a colleague should not speak to the colleague harshly so that the colleague becomes embarrassed, as  states: "You should . . . not bear a sin because of him." It is forbidden for a person to embarrass a fellow Jew, and even more to embarrass a fellow Jew in public. This applies to matters between one person and another. In regard to spiritual matters, however, if a transgressor does not repent after being admonished in private, the transgressor may be shamed in public and the transgressor's sin may be publicized. Maimonides taught that such a transgressor may be subjected to abuse, scorn, and curses until the transgressor repents, as was the practice of the prophets of Israel. But Maimonides taught that it is pious behavior for a person who was wronged by a colleague not to admonish the offender or mention the matter at all because the offender was very boorish or because the offender was mentally disturbed, provided that the person forgives the offender totally without bearing any feelings of hate or admonishing the offender.  is concerned only with those who carry feelings of hate.

Maimonides taught that a person who takes revenge against a colleague transgresses a Torah prohibition, as  states: "Do not take revenge." One should train oneself to rise above one's feelings about all worldly things, for people of understanding consider all these things as vanity and emptiness for which it is not worth seeking revenge. Paraphrasing the Sifra (reported in "In classical rabbinic interpretation: Chapter 19" above), Maimonides taught that taking revenge includes the case where a colleague asks a person to borrow a hatchet and the person refuses to lend it. On the following day, the person who refused asks to borrow a hatchet from his colleague. The colleague responds that just as the person did not lend it to the colleague, the colleague will not lend it to the person. This is considered taking revenge. Instead, when the person comes to ask for the hatchet, the colleague should give it to the person with a full heart, without repaying the person for what the person did. Similarly, Maimonides taught that anyone who holds a grudge against another Jew violates a Torah prohibition, as  states: "Do not bear a grudge against the children of your people." Once again paraphrasing the Sifra (above), Maimonides taught that bearing a grudge includes the case where Reuven asked Shimon to rent Shimon's house to Reuven or lend an ox to him, and Shimon was not willing to do so. A few days later, Shimon came to borrow or rent something from Reuven, and Reuven told Shimon, "Here, it is. I am lending it to you. I am not like you, nor am I paying you back for what you did." A person who acts this way violates the prohibition against bearing a grudge. Instead, the person should wipe the matter from the person's heart and never bring it to mind. As long as the person brings the matter to mind and remembers it, there is the possibility that the person will seek revenge. Therefore,  condemned holding a grudge, requiring one to wipe the wrong from one's heart entirely. Maimonides taught that this quality permits a stable environment, trade, and commerce to be established among people.

Reading , "Love your neighbor as yourself," Maimonides taught that all Jews are commanded to love all other Jews as themselves. Therefore, they should speak the praises of others and show concern for their money just as they do with their own money and their own honor. Maimonides taught that whoever gains honor through the degradation of a colleague does not have a share in the World to Come. Maimonides taught that the commandment of  thus includes the commandments of Rabbinic origin to visit the sick, comfort mourners, to prepare for a funeral, prepare a bride, accompany guests, attend to all the needs of a burial, carry a corpse on one shoulders, walk before the bier, mourn, dig a grave, and bury the dead, and also to bring joy to a bride and groom and help them in all their needs.

Naḥmanides taught that the human heart is unable to accept a command to love one's neighbor as oneself. Noting that Rabbi Akiva taught that one's life takes precedence over the life of one's fellow, Naḥmanides read  to means that one is to love one's fellow as one loves all good for oneself. Naḥmanides taught that if one loved one's neighbor completely, one would want the friend to gain riches, properties, honor, knowledge, and wisdom. But because of human nature, one would still not want the neighbor to be one's equal, for one would always have a desire that one should have more of these good things than the neighbor. Therefore,  commanded that this degrading jealousy should not exist in one's heart, but instead one should love to do good abundantly for one's fellow as one does for oneself, and one should place no limitations upon one's love for one's fellow.

In modern interpretation
The parashah is discussed in these modern sources:

Leviticus chapter 19

In 1950, the Committee on Jewish Law and Standards of Conservative Judaism ruled: “Refraining from the use of a motor vehicle is an important aid in the maintenance of the Sabbath spirit of repose. Such restraint aids, moreover, in keeping the members of the family together on the Sabbath. However where a family resides beyond reasonable walking distance from the synagogue, the use of a motor vehicle for the purpose of synagogue attendance shall in no wise be construed as a violation of the Sabbath but, on the contrary, such attendance shall be deemed an expression of loyalty to our faith. . . . [I]n the spirit of a living and developing Halachah responsive to the changing needs of our people, we declare it to be permitted to use electric lights on the Sabbath for the purpose of enhancing the enjoyment of the Sabbath, or reducing personal discomfort in the performance of a mitzvah.”

The Committee noted that the Rabbis taught that God both authorizes us and requires us to heal. The Talmud understood  to give "permission for the physician to cure." The Committee thus concluded that Jewish law requires that individuals and families, physicians and other health care providers, and the community provide people with at least a decent minimum of health care that preserves life and meets other basic needs. The Committee concluded that the national society bears ultimate responsibility to assure provision of needed health care for people who cannot afford it, and Jewish citizens should support (by lobbying and other means) societal institutions that will fulfill that responsibility.

Dever argued that varieties of sheqel weights that archeologists found in well-stratified archaeological contexts of the late 8th and early 7th centuries help to explain texts like  that refer to the balances with which Israelites used the weights. Dever concluded that the doctored weights that archeologists found give these passages the ring of truth as calling for the reform of an economic system that actually existed.

Leviticus chapter 20
From Orthodox Judaism, in 2010, four leaders of the Rabbi Isaac Elchanan Theological Seminary of Yeshiva University posted a statement saying that the Torah absolutely prohibits homosexual behavior, and with respect to homosexuality, the study of Torah will place observant Jews at odds with political correctness and the temper of the times, but they must be honest with themselves and with God, regardless of the consequences. In 1977, the Central Conference of American Rabbis of Reform Judaism adopted a resolution encouraging legislation to decriminalize homosexual acts between consenting adults and prohibit discrimination against them. In 2006, the Committee on Jewish Law and Standards of Conservative Judaism approved by a 13-to-12 vote a responsum that held while that the explicit biblical ban on anal sex between men remains in effect, for homosexuals who are incapable of maintaining a heterosexual relationship, the rabbinic prohibitions that have been associated with other gay and lesbian intimate acts are superseded based upon the Talmudic principle of the obligation to preserve the human dignity of all people, in effect normalizing the status of gay and lesbian Jews in the Jewish community, while explicitly not ruling on the question of gay marriage. Then in 2013, the Central Conference of American Rabbis Responsa Committee adopted a responsum holding that Reform rabbis officiate with the full support of the CCAR at the marriage ceremonies of Jews of the same sex and Reform rabbis may consider these same-sex marriages to be kiddushin, utilizing in the marriage ceremony the Jewish forms and rites that are most appropriate to the partners involved.

MacDonald wrote that the term for milk (chalav) could easily be the word for "fat" (chelev), and the word for honey (devash) could indicate not bees' honey but a sweet syrup made from fruit. The expression evoked a general sense of the bounty of the land and suggested an ecological richness exhibited in a number of ways, not just with milk and honey. MacDonald noted that the expression was always used to describe a land that the people of Israel had not yet experienced, and thus characterized it as always a future expectation.

Commandments
According to Sefer ha-Chinuch, there are 13 positive and 38 negative commandments in the parashah:
To revere one's father and mother
Not to turn to idolatry
Not to make an idol
Not to eat meat left over from sacrifices
Not to reap a corner of one's field, so that the poor may glean
Not to reap the very last end of one's field, so that the poor may glean
To leave gleanings for the poor

Not to gather the gleanings, so that the poor may take them
To leave a part of a vineyard unreaped, for the poor
Not to gather the gleanings of a vineyard, so that the poor may take them
To leave the unformed clusters of grapes for the poor
Not to steal
Not to deny possession of something entrusted to you
Not to swear in denial of a monetary claim
Not to swear falsely in God's Name
Not to withhold wages or fail to repay a debt
Not to rob or defraud one's neighbor
Not to delay payment of wages past the agreed time
Not to curse any upstanding Jew
Not to put a stumbling block before nor give harmful advice (lifnei iver) to a trusting person
Not to pervert justice
A judge must not respect the great man at the trial.
To judge righteously
Not to speak derogatorily of others
Not to stand idly by if someone's life is in danger
Not to hate fellow Jew
To reprove a sinner
Not to embarrass others
Not to take revenge
Not to bear a grudge
To love others as one loves oneself
Not to crossbreed animals
Not to plant diverse seeds together
Not to eat fruit of a tree during its first three years
The fourth year crops must be totally for holy purposes.
Not to eat like a glutton or drink like a drunkard
Not to be superstitious
Not to engage in astrology
Men must not shave the hair off the sides of their head.
Men must not shave their beards with a razor.
Not to tattoo the skin
To show reverence to the Temple
Not to act as a medium
Not to act as a magical seer
To honor those who teach and know Torah
Not to commit injustice with scales and weights
Each individual must ensure that his scales and weights are accurate
Not to curse one's father or mother
The courts must carry out the death penalty of burning
Not to imitate idolaters in customs and clothing

In the liturgy

Haftarah
The haftarah for the parashah is:
for Ashkenazi Jews: 
for Sephardi Jews: 

When parashah Kedoshim is combined with parashah Acharei (as it is in non-leap years, e.g., 2018, 2020, 2021, 2023, 2025, and 2026), the haftarah for the week is that for parashah Kedoshim.

See also
Conservative Judaism and sexual orientation

Notes

Further reading
The parashah has parallels or is discussed in these sources:

Biblical
 (being holy).
 (Molech);  (corners of fields).
 (passing children through the fire);  (paying wages promptly).
, 33 (Molech).
 (son pass through fire);  (children pass through fire);  (son pass through fire);  (Molech).
 (keeping the Sabbath);  (Molech or king);  (universally observed Sabbath).
 (child sacrifice);  (shaving);  (paying wages);  (Molech);  (shaving);  (shaving);  (Molech or Malcam).
 (sacrificing children);  (the just does not rob);  (violations of the Holiness Code);  (sacrifice of sons).
 (Molech or king).

 (Molech).
 (consideration for the poor);  (unrighteous judgment);  (God's choice of Israel);  (the poor).
 (children pass through fire).

Ancient
Confucius. The Analects 3:15:23. ("Tsze-kung asked, saying, ‘Is there one word which may serve as a rule of practice for all one's life?' The Master said, ‘Is not Reciprocity such a word? What you do not want done to yourself, do not do to others.'"). China, circa 5th Century B.C.E.

Aristotle. 4th Century B.C.E. ("We should behave to our friends as we would wish our friends to behave to us.") Quoted in Diogenes Laërtius. Lives and Opinions of Eminent Philosophers , 5:11. 3rd century CE. Translated by C.D. Yonge. 19th century. Reprinted Kessinger Publishing, 2007. .

Early nonrabbinic
 Between 225 and 175 BCE. (“And what you hate, do not do to anyone.”).

Philo. Allegorical Interpretation, book 3, ¶ 7:22; On the Birth of Abel and the Sacrifices Offered by Him and by His Brother Cain, ¶ 22:77; Concerning Noah's Work as a Planter , ¶¶ 22:95, 25:109, 27:113, 28:117, 33:135; Who Is the Heir of Divine Things? ¶ 33:162; On Flight and Finding, ¶ 34:188; On Abraham, ¶ 2:13; The Special Laws, book 1, ¶¶ 4:25, 41:224; book 2, ¶¶ 43:238–39; book 4, ¶¶ 7:39, 35:183, 37:193, 38:197; On the Virtues, ¶ 15:88. Alexandria, Egypt, early 1st century CE, in, e.g., The Works of Philo: Complete and Unabridged, New Updated Edition. Translated by Charles Duke Yonge, pages 52, 104, 199–202, 289, 338, 389, 412, 536, 555, 591, 619, 634–35, 648. Peabody, Massachusetts: Hendrickson Publishers, 1993. .
James  Circa 45–62 C.E. ("If you really keep the royal law found in Scripture, ‘Love your neighbor as yourself,' you are doing right."). 
Galatians  Circa 49–58 C.E. ("The entire law is summed up in a single command: ‘Love your neighbor as yourself.'"). 
Romans  Greece, circa 58 C.E. ("Let no debt remain outstanding, except the continuing debt to love one another, for he who loves his fellowman has fulfilled the law. The commandments . . . are summed up in this one rule: ‘Love your neighbor as yourself.'"). 
Mark  Circa 70 C.E. ("The second is this: ‘Love your neighbor as yourself.' There is no commandment greater than these."). 
Matthew  ("So in everything, do to others what you would have them do to you, for this sums up the Law and the Prophets.");  ("‘love your neighbor as yourself.'");  ("And the second is like it: ‘Love your neighbor as yourself.' All the Law and the Prophets hang on these two commandments."). Circa 70–100 C.E.
Luke  ("Do to others as you would have them do to you.");  ("Love your neighbor as yourself."). Circa 80–150 CE.
Acts  Circa 80–150 CE. (Molech). 
Josephus. Antiquities of the Jews book 4, chapter 8, paragraph 11 . Circa 93–94. In, e.g., The Works of Josephus: Complete and Unabridged, New Updated Edition. Translated by William Whiston, page 117. Peabody, Massachusetts: Hendrickson Publishers, 1987. . (mixtures of wool and linen).

Classical rabbinic
Mishnah: Peah 1:1–8:9; Kilayim 1:1–9:10; Sheviit 1:8; Terumot 3:9; Orlah 1:1–3:9; Shabbat 1:1–24:5; Shekalim 1:1; Yevamot 8:6; Nedarim 1:1–11:11; Kiddushin 1:7, 1:9; Bava Kamma 5:7; Bava Metzia 5:11, 7:7, 9:11–12; Sanhedrin 1:3–4; 3:7; 7:4, 6–8, 10–11; 8:7; 9:1; Makkot 3:5–6, 8–9; Shevuot 1:1–8:6; Keritot 1:1, 2:4–6, 6:9. Land of Israel, circa 200 CE. In, e.g., The Mishnah: A New Translation. Translated by Jacob Neusner, pages 14–36, 49–68, 70, 100, 158–66, 251, 356, 424, 428, 489, 515, 544, 548, 583–84, 589, 597–98, 602, 617–18, 836, 840, 851. New Haven: Yale University Press, 1988. .
Tosefta: Peah 1:1–4:21; Demai 5:2; Kilayim 1:1–5:27; Maasrot 3:12; Orlah 1:1–8; Bikkurim 2:4; Shabbat 15:9; 17:1; Megillah 3:24; Sotah 5:11; 15:7; Gittin 2:7; Kiddushin 1:4; Bava Metzia 10:3; Bava Batra 5:7; Sanhedrin 3:1; 6:2; 9:11; 12:1; Shevuot 3:1. Land of Israel, circa 250 CE. In, e.g., The Tosefta: Translated from the Hebrew, with a New Introduction. Translated by Jacob Neusner, volume 1, pages 47–76, 103, 251–76, 292, 341–43, 349, 415, 423, 650, 853, 891, 901, 925–26; volume 2, pages 1084, 1115, 1150, 1164, 1178, 1185, 1229. Peabody, Massachusetts: Hendrickson Publishers, 2002. .
Sifra ¶¶ 195:1–210:2. Land of Israel, 4th century CE. In, e.g., Sifra: An Analytical Translation. Translated by Jacob Neusner, volume 3, pages 85–159. Atlanta: Scholars Press, 1988. .
Jerusalem Talmud: Berakhot 60a; Peah 1a–73b; Kilayim 1a–84b; Sheviit 12a, 59a; Maasrot 37b; Maaser Sheni 49b, 51a; Orlah 1a–42a; Bikkurim 23a–b; Shabbat 1a–113b; Pesachim 14b; Rosh Hashanah 8a, 9b; Yevamot 11a, 33a, 57a, 61a, 62a; Nedarim 11a, 32a; Nazir 27b; Sotah 3a, 6a, 11b, 41b, 49b–50a; Kiddushin 5a–b, 20b–21a; Bava Kamma 22b; Bava Metzia 13b, 23a, 32b–33a; Sanhedrin 3b, 29b, 34b; Shevuot 1a–. Tiberias, Land of Israel, circa 400 CE. In, e.g., Talmud Yerushalmi. Edited by Chaim Malinowitz, Yisroel Simcha Schorr, and Mordechai Marcus, volumes 2–3, 6a–b, 9–10, 12–13, 18, 24, 29–30, 33, 35–37, 40–42. Brooklyn: Mesorah Publications, 2006–2018. And reprinted in, e.g., The Jerusalem Talmud: A Translation and Commentary. Edited by Jacob Neusner and translated by Jacob Neusner, Tzvee Zahavy, B. Barry Levy, and Edward Goldman. Peabody, Massachusetts: Hendrickson Publishers, 2009. .
Genesis Rabbah 1:15; 7:4; 15:7; 21:7; 24:7; 46:4; 55:3; 81:1; 90:2. Land of Israel, 5th century. In, e.g., Midrash Rabbah: Genesis. Translated by Harry Freedman and Maurice Simon, volume 1, pages 13–14, 51–52, 122–24, 176–77, 204, 391, 483; volume 2, pages 745, 827–28. London: Soncino Press, 1939. .
Mekhilta de-Rabbi Shimon 49:3; 45:1–2; 61:1; 62:1, 3; 66:1; 74:4; 76:3; 77:3. Land of Israel, 5th century. In, e.g., Mekhilta de-Rabbi Shimon bar Yohai. Translated by W. David Nelson, pages 218, 249–50, 278, 282, 284–85, 294, 348, 355, 359. Philadelphia: Jewish Publication Society, 2006. .
Leviticus Rabbah 19:4; 24:1–25:8; 26:7; 27:3; 30:10; 35:3; 36:1. Land of Israel, 5th century. In, e.g., Midrash Rabbah: Leviticus. Translated by Harry Freedman and Maurice Simon, volume 4, pages 242, 304–24, 330–36, 346, 391, 448, 456. London: Soncino Press, 1939. .

Babylonian Talmud: Berakhot 10b, 21b, 35a, 36a–b; Shabbat 23a, 31a, 69b, 71b, 108a, 149a; Eruvin 17b; Pesachim 3a, 16b, 22b, 75a, 78a, 113b; Yoma 18b, 23a, 36a–b, 43a, 69a, 81b, 85b; Sukkah 34b–35a; Beitzah 3b, 5a, 14b, 25b, 28b; Rosh Hashanah 2a, 9b, 31b; Taanit 6b; Megillah 7b, 17b; Moed Katan 2a–b, 4b–5a, 9a, 14b, 17a; Chagigah 4a, 7a, 16a, 25b; Yevamot 2b, 4a–6b, 37b, 46b–47a, 54a–55b, 65b, 94b–95a, 97a, 122a; Ketubot 29a, 30b, 36a, 37b, 46a, 80a; Nedarim 2a–91b; Nazir 29a, 37a, 41a, 57b, 58b; Sotah 7a, 8b, 43b; Gittin 39b, 41b, 43a–b, 47a, 53a–b, 54b, 59b, 85a; Kiddushin 6a, 19a, 23a, 29a, 30b, 31b–32b, 33b, 34b, 35b, 37a, 39a, 41a, 54b, 56b; Bava Kamma 16b, 28a, 51a, 54b–55a, 68b–69b, 70b, 76b, 80b, 94a, 99a, 101a, 105b, 113a; Bava Metzia 5b, 9b, 10b, 12a, 21b, 26b, 31a, 32a, 49a, 55b, 59b, 61b, 75b, 83b, 90b–91a, 92b, 94b, 101a, 110b–11b; Bava Batra 24a, 27a, 36a, 89b, 94a; Sanhedrin 2a, 3a, 15a, 29a, 30a, 31a, 32b, 33b, 39a, 40b, 45a, 46a, 50b–53a, 54a–55a, 57a, 60a, 63a, 64a–65a, 66a, 67b, 69a, 70a, 73a, 75a–76a, 84b, 85b–86a; Makkot 4b, 5b, 7b, 8b, 13b–14b, 16a–b, 20a–22b; Shevuot 2a–49b; Avodah Zarah 6a–b, 10b, 22a, 54b, 62a, 64a, 65b, 68a; Horayot 4a, 11a; Zevachim 5b, 23b, 28a–b, 44a, 47a, 56b, 72a; Menachot 5b–6a, 16b, 25a, 69b, 90b, 110a; Chullin 3a, 7b, 13a, 26b, 29a, 31a, 71a, 74b, 78b–79a, 82b, 85a, 95b, 114a–15b, 120b, 121a, 130b–31b, 134b, 135b, 137a, 138a, 141a–b; Arakhin 16b; Temurah 3a, 4a, 6a, 28b; Keritot 3a–b, 5a, 9a–b, 10b–11a, 12b, 15a, 16a, 21a–b, 22b, 24a, 28a; Meilah 2a, 10a, 16b–17a, 18a; Tamid 27b; Niddah 17a, 41b, 50a, 51a, 57a. Babylonia, 6th century. In, e.g., Talmud Bavli. Edited by Yisroel Simcha Schorr, Chaim Malinowitz, and Mordechai Marcus, 72 volumes. Brooklyn: Mesorah Pubs., 2006.

Medieval
Deuteronomy Rabbah 1:6; 6:3; 7:3. Land of Israel, 9th century. In, e.g., Midrash Rabbah: Deuteronomy. Translated by Harry Freedman and Maurice Simon, volume 7, pages 6, 123, 135. London: Soncino Press, 1939. .
Saadia Gaon. Emunoth ve-Deoth (Beliefs and Opinions). Baghdad, Babylonia, 933. In, e.g., The Book of Beliefs and Opinions. Translated by Samuel Rosenblatt, pages 31–32, 128, 130, 219–20, 225–26, 254, 327–28, 385. New Haven: Yale University Press, 1948. .

Exodus Rabbah 1:28; 15:24; 31:16; 38:7; 43:5. 10th century. In, e.g., Midrash Rabbah: Exodus. Translated by Simon M. Lehrman, volume 3, pages 36, 195, 398, 455, 500. London: Soncino Press, 1939. .
Rashi. Commentary. Leviticus 19–20. Troyes, France, late 11th century. In, e.g., Rashi. The Torah: With Rashi's Commentary Translated, Annotated, and Elucidated. Translated and annotated by Yisrael Isser Zvi Herczeg, volume 3, pages 225–59. Brooklyn: Mesorah Publications, 1994. .
Rashbam. Commentary on the Torah. Troyes, early 12th century. In, e.g., Rashbam's Commentary on Leviticus and Numbers: An Annotated Translation. Edited and translated by Martin I. Lockshin, pages 97–114. Providence: Brown Judaic Studies, 2001. .
Judah Halevi. Kuzari. 3:11; [[s:Kitab al Khazari/Part Four|4:3}}E Toledo, Spain, 1130–1140. In, e.g., Jehuda Halevi. Kuzari: An Argument for the Faith of Israel. Introduction by Henry Slonimsky, pages 148, 203. New York: Schocken, 1964. .
Numbers Rabbah 1:8; 2:8; 8:2, 7; 9:2, 7, 10, 12, 45; 10:1, 5; 11:7; 14:6; 15:17; 17:5; 19:2, 5; 20:14, 19. 12th century. In, e.g., Midrash Rabbah: Numbers. Translated by Judah J. Slotki, volume 5, pages 14, 32, 205, 229, 239, 248, 256, 263, 318, 334–36, 364, 437; volume 6, pages 590, 660–61, 705, 747, 755, 802, 811. London: Soncino Press, 1939. .

Abraham ibn Ezra. Commentary on the Torah. Mid-12th century. In, e.g., Ibn Ezra's Commentary on the Pentateuch: Leviticus (Va-yikra). Translated and annotated by H. Norman Strickman and Arthur M. Silver, volume 3, pages 153–85. New York: Menorah Publishing Company, 2004. .
Bahir, part 1, paragraph 180. Provence, circa 1174. In, e.g., The Bahir: A Translation and Commentary. Translation and commentary by Aryeh Kaplan, pages 69–70. Lanham, Maryland: Jason Aronson, 1977. .
Maimonides. Mishneh Torah: Hilchot De'ot (The Laws of Personality Development), chapter 6, ¶¶ 3, 5–9; chapter 7, ¶¶ 1–8. Hilchot Talmud Torah (The Laws of Torah Study), chapter 6, ¶ 1. Egypt. Circa 1170–1180. In, e.g., Mishneh Torah: Hilchot De'ot: The Laws of Personality Development: and Hilchot Talmud Torah: The Laws of Torah Study. Translated by Za'ev Abramson and Eliyahu Touger, volume 2, pages 120–33, 136–51, 248–51. New York: Moznaim Publishing, 1989.
Maimonides. Mishneh Torah: Hilchot Avodat Kochavim V'Chukkoteihem (The Laws of the Worship of Stars and their Statutes), chapter 11, ¶ 9. Egypt. Circa 1170–1180. In, e.g., Mishneh Torah: Hilchot Avodat Kochavim V'Chukkoteihem: The Laws of the Worship of Stars and their Statutes. Translated by Eliyahu Touger, volume 3, pages 206–07. New York: Moznaim Publishing, 1990.  .

Maimonides. Mishneh Torah: Hilchot Shevuot (The Laws of Oaths), chapter 1, ¶¶ 3, 8. Egypt. Circa 1170–1180. In, e.g., Mishneh Torah: Sefer Hafla'ah: The Book of Utterances. Translated by Eliyahu Touger, pages 14–19. New York: Moznaim Publishing, 2003. .
Maimonides. Mishneh Torah: Hilchot Kilayim (The Laws of Forbidden Mixtures). Hilchot Matnot Aniyim (The Laws of Gifts to the Poor), chapter 1, ¶ 5. Egypt. Circa 1170–1180. In, e.g., Mishneh Torah: Sefer Zeraim: The Book of Agricultural Ordinances. Translated by Eliyahu Touger, pages 12–101, 104–07. New York: Moznaim Publishing, 2005. .
Maimonides. Mishneh Torah: Hilchot Me'ilah (The Laws of Misappropriation (of Consecrated Property)), chapter 8, ¶ 8. Egypt. Circa 1170–1180. In, e.g., Mishneh Torah: Sefer Ha'Avodah: The Book of (Temple) Service. Translated by Eliyahu Touger, pages 898–901. New York: Moznaim Publishing, 2007. .
Maimonides. Mishneh Torah: Hilchot Tum'at Ochalin (The Laws of the Impurity of Foods), chapter 16, ¶ 12. Egypt. Circa 1170–1180. In, e.g., Mishneh Torah: Sefer Taharah: The Book of Purity. Translated by Eliyahu Touger, volume 2, pages 294–95. New York: Moznaim Publishing, 2009. .
Maimonides. Mishneh Torah: Hilchot Geneivah (The Laws Pertaining to Theft), chapter 7, ¶ 1. Hilchot Gezelah Va'Avedah (The Laws Pertaining to Robbery and Lost Articles), chapter 1. Hilchot Rotze'ach USh'mirat Nefesh (The Laws of Murderers and the Protection of Human Life), chapter 12, ¶ 14. Egypt. Circa 1170–1180. In, e.g., Mishneh Torah: Sefer Nezikin: The Book of Damages. Translated by Eliyahu Touger, pages 206–09, 232–41, 594–97. New York: Moznaim Publishing, 1997. .
Maimonides. Mishneh Torah: Hilchot Sechirut (The Laws of Rentals and Employer-Employee Relations), chapter 11, ¶ 2. Egypt. Circa 1170–1180. In, e.g., Mishneh Torah: Sefer Mishpatim: The Book of Judgments. Translated by Eliyahu Touger, pages 108–09. New York: Moznaim Publishing, 2000. .
Maimonides. Mishneh Torah: Hilchot Sanhedrin V'HaOnshin Hamesurim Lahem (The Laws of the Courts and the Penalties placed under their Jurisdiction), chapter 13, ¶ 4. Hilchot Mamrim (The Laws of the Rebellious Ones), chapter 6, ¶¶ 1, 12; chapter 7, ¶ 1. Hilchot Evel (The Laws of Mourning), chapter 14, ¶ 1, in, e.g., Mishneh Torah: Sefer Shoftim: The Book of Judges. Translated by Eliyahu Touger, pages 100–03, 316–17, 384–85, 484–85. New York: Moznaim Publishing, 2001. .
Hezekiah ben Manoah. Hizkuni. France, circa 1240. In, e.g., Chizkiyahu ben Manoach. Chizkuni: Torah Commentary. Translated and annotated by Eliyahu Munk, volume 3, pages 762–80. Jerusalem: Ktav Publishers, 2013. .
Naḥmanides. Commentary on the Torah. Jerusalem, circa 1270. In, e.g., Ramban (Nachmanides): Commentary on the Torah. Translated by Charles B. Chavel, volume 3, pages 281–325. New York: Shilo Publishing House, 1974. .

Zohar, part 1, pages 5b–6a, 8b, 204b, 207b, 228b; part 2, pages 15b, 30b, 49b, 89a, 108b, 122a, 182b, 215b–16a, 225b; part 3, pages 42b, 49a, 80a–88a. Spain, late 13th century. In, e.g., The Zohar. Translated by Harry Sperling and Maurice Simon. 5 volumes. London: Soncino Press, 1934.
Bahya ben Asher. Commentary on the Torah. Spain, early 14th century. In, e.g., Midrash Rabbeinu Bachya: Torah Commentary by Rabbi Bachya ben Asher. Translated and annotated by Eliyahu Munk, volume 5, pages 1729–66. Jerusalem: Lambda Publishers, 2003. .
Jacob ben Asher (Baal Ha-Turim). Rimze Ba'al ha-Turim. Early 14th century. In, e.g., Baal Haturim Chumash: Vayikra/Leviticus. Translated by Eliyahu Touger, edited, elucidated, and annotated by Avie Gold, volume 3, pages 1191–219. Brooklyn: Mesorah Publications, 2000. .
Jacob ben Asher. Perush Al ha-Torah. Early 14th century. In, e.g., Yaakov ben Asher. Tur on the Torah. Translated and annotated by Eliyahu Munk, volume 3, pages 907–42. Jerusalem: Lambda Publishers, 2005. .
Isaac Abrabanel. Principles of Faith. Naples, Italy, 1494. In, e.g., Isaac Abravanel. Principles of Faith (Rosh Amanah). Translated by Menachem Marc Kellner, pages 107, 126, 164, 170, 197. Rutherford, New Jersey: Fairleigh Dickinson University Press, 1982. .
Isaac ben Moses Arama. Akedat Yizhak (The Binding of Isaac). Late 15th century. In, e.g., Yitzchak Arama. Akeydat Yitzchak: Commentary of Rabbi Yitzchak Arama on the Torah. Translated and condensed by Eliyahu Munk, volume 2, pages 611–33. New York, Lambda Publishers, 2001. .

Modern
Isaac Abravanel. Commentary on the Torah. Italy, between 1492 and 1509. In, e.g., Abarbanel: Selected Commentaries on the Torah: Volume 3: Vayikra/Leviticus. Translated and annotated by Israel Lazar, pages 164–91. Brooklyn: CreateSpace, 2015. .
Obadiah ben Jacob Sforno. Commentary on the Torah. Venice, 1567. In, e.g., Sforno: Commentary on the Torah. Translation and explanatory notes by Raphael Pelcovitz, pages 578–89. Brooklyn: Mesorah Publications, 1997. .
Moshe Alshich. Commentary on the Torah. Safed, circa 1593. In, e.g., Moshe Alshich. Midrash of Rabbi Moshe Alshich on the Torah. Translated and annotated by Eliyahu Munk, volume 2, pages 699–717. New York, Lambda Publishers, 2000. .

Avraham Yehoshua Heschel. Commentaries on the Torah. Cracow, Poland, mid 17th century. Compiled as Chanukat HaTorah. Edited by Chanoch Henoch Erzohn. Piotrkow, Poland, 1900. In Avraham Yehoshua Heschel. Chanukas HaTorah: Mystical Insights of Rav Avraham Yehoshua Heschel on Chumash. Translated by Avraham Peretz Friedman, pages 230–35. Southfield, Michigan: Targum Press/Feldheim Publishers, 2004. .
Thomas Hobbes. Leviathan, 3:40. England, 1651. Reprint edited by C. B. Macpherson, pages 503–04. Harmondsworth, England: Penguin Classics, 1982. .
Shabbethai Bass. Sifsei Chachamim. Amsterdam, 1680. In, e.g., Sefer Vayikro: From the Five Books of the Torah: Chumash: Targum Okelos: Rashi: Sifsei Chachamim: Yalkut: Haftaros, translated by Avrohom Y. Davis, pages 351–401. Lakewood Township, New Jersey: Metsudah Publications, 2012.

Chaim ibn Attar. Ohr ha-Chaim. Venice, 1742. In Chayim ben Attar. Or Hachayim: Commentary on the Torah. Translated by Eliyahu Munk, volume 3, pages 1190–236. Brooklyn: Lambda Publishers, 1999. .
Immanuel Kant. Groundwork of the Metaphysic of Morals, Second Section. Germany, 1785. ("There is therefore but one categorical imperative, namely, this: Act only on that maxim whereby thou canst at the same time will that it should become a universal law.").

Nachman of Breslov. Teachings. Bratslav, Ukraine, before 1811. In Rebbe Nachman's Torah: Breslov Insights into the Weekly Torah Reading: Exodus-Leviticus. Compiled by Chaim Kramer, edited by Y. Hall, pages 364–87. Jerusalem: Breslov Research Institute, 2011. .

George Eliot. Adam Bede, chapter 18. Edinburgh and London: William Blackwood and Sons, 1859. Reprinted, e.g., edited by Carol A. Martin, page 172. Oxford: Oxford University Press, 2008. (Mrs. Poyser recalls to Mr. Poyser how she quoted  to Dinah to encourage her to treat herself better, saying: “I told her, she went clean again’ the Scriptur, for that says, ‘Love your neighbour as yourself;’ ‘but,’ I said, ‘if you loved your neighbour no better nor you do yourself, Dinah, it’s little enough you’d do for him. You’d be thinking he might do well enough on a half-empty stomach.’”).
Samuel David Luzzatto (Shadal). Commentary on the Torah. Padua, 1871. In, e.g., Samuel David Luzzatto. Torah Commentary. Translated and annotated by Eliyahu Munk, volume 3, pages 962–73. New York: Lambda Publishers, 2012. .
Samson Raphael Hirsch. The Jewish Sabbath. Frankfurt, before 1889. Translated by Ben Josephussoro. 1911. Reprinted Lexington, Kentucky: CreateSpace Independent Publishing Platform, 2014. .

Yehudah Aryeh Leib Alter. Sefat Emet. Góra Kalwaria (Ger), Poland, before 1906. Excerpted in The Language of Truth: The Torah Commentary of Sefat Emet. Translated and interpreted by Arthur Green, pages 185–91. Philadelphia: Jewish Publication Society, 1998. . Reprinted 2012. .
Hermann Cohen. Religion of Reason: Out of the Sources of Judaism. Translated with an introduction by Simon Kaplan; introductory essays by Leo Strauss, pages 96, 103, 110, 127, 145, 152, 205, 229, 348, 422, 430, 451. New York: Ungar, 1972. Reprinted Atlanta: Scholars Press, 1995. . Originally published as Religion der Vernunft aus den Quellen des Judentums. Leipzig: Gustav Fock, 1919.

Sigmund Freud. “The Savage's Dread of Incest.” In Totem and Taboo: Resemblances Between the Psychic Lives of Savages and Neurotics. Translated by A.A. Brill. New York: Moffat, Yard and Company, 1919. Originally published as Totem und Tabu: Einige Übereinstimmungen im Seelenleben der Wilden und der Neurotiker. Leipzig, 1913.
Fritz Lang. Metropolis. Babelsberg: Universum Film A.G., 1927. (early science fiction film with Molech plot element).
Alexander Alan Steinbach. Sabbath Queen: Fifty-four Bible Talks to the Young Based on Each Portion of the Pentateuch, pages 93–96. New York: Behrman's Jewish Book House, 1936.

Thomas Mann. Joseph and His Brothers. Translated by John E. Woods, pages 79, 82–83, 152–53, 189, 201–02, 226–27, 336, 351, 384–86, 927. New York: Alfred A. Knopf, 2005. . Originally published as Joseph und seine Brüder. Stockholm: Bermann-Fischer Verlag, 1943.
Morris Adler, Jacob B. Agus, and Theodore Friedman. “Responsum on the Sabbath.” Proceedings of the Rabbinical Assembly, volume 14 (1950), pages 112–88. New York: Rabbinical Assembly of America, 1951. In Proceedings of the Committee on Jewish Law and Standards of the Conservative Movement 1927–1970, volume 3 (Responsa), pages 1109–34. Jerusalem: The Rabbinical Assembly and The Institute of Applied Hallakhah, 1997.

Abraham Joshua Heschel. The Sabbath. New York: Farrar, Straus and Giroux, 1951. Reprinted 2005. .
Julian Morgenstern. “The Decalogue of the Holiness Code.” Hebrew Union College Annual, volume 26 (1955): pages 1–27.
Morris Adler. The World of the Talmud, pages 27–28, 40–41. B'nai B'rith Hillel Foundations, 1958. Reprinted Kessinger Publishing, 2007. .
James A. Michener. The Source, pages 106–20. New York: Random House, 1965. (child sacrifice).
Central Conference of American Rabbis. "Rights of Homosexuals." (1977).
Gordon J. Wenham. The Book of Leviticus, pages 261–88. Grand Rapids, Michigan: William B. Eerdmans Publishing Company, 1979. .
Pinchas H. Peli. Torah Today: A Renewed Encounter with Scripture, pages 137–41. Washington, D.C.: B'nai B'rith Books, 1987. .
John G. Gammie. Holiness in Israel. Eugene, Oregon: Wipf & Stock Publishers, 1989. .
Mark S. Smith. The Early History of God: Yahweh and the Other Deities in Ancient Israel, pages 127, 129, 132–33. New York: HarperSanFrancisco, 1990. .
Harvey J. Fields. A Torah Commentary for Our Times: Volume II: Exodus and Leviticus, pages 127–37. New York: UAHC Press, 1991. .
"Consensus Statement on Homosexuality." New York: Rabbinical Assembly, 1992. EH 24.1992a. In Responsa: 1991–2000: The Committee on Jewish Law and Standards of the Conservative Movement. Edited by Kassel Abelson and David J. Fine, page 612. New York: Rabbinical Assembly, 2002. .
Joel Roth. "Homosexuality." New York: Rabbinical Assembly, 1992. EH 24.1992b. In Responsa: 1991–2000: The Committee on Jewish Law and Standards of the Conservative Movement. Edited by Kassel Abelson and David J. Fine, pages 613–75. New York: Rabbinical Assembly, 2002. .
Howard Handler. "In the Image of God: A Dissent in Favor of the Full Equality of Gay and Lesbian Jews into the Community of Conservative Judaism." New York: Rabbinical Assembly, 1992. EH 24.1992h. In Responsa: 1991–2000: The Committee on Jewish Law and Standards of the Conservative Movement. Edited by Kassel Abelson and David J. Fine, pages 718–21. New York: Rabbinical Assembly, 2002. .
Aaron Wildavsky. Assimilation versus Separation: Joseph the Administrator and the Politics of Religion in Biblical Israel, pages 3–4. New Brunswick, New Jersey: Transaction Publishers, 1993. .
Jacob Milgrom. "Does the Bible Prohibit Homosexuality? The biblical prohibition is addressed only to Israel. It is incorrect to apply it on a universal scale." Bible Review. Volume 9 (number 6) (December 1993).
Walter C. Kaiser Jr., " The Book of Leviticus," in The New Interpreter's Bible, volume 1, pages 1128–44. Nashville: Abingdon Press, 1994. .
Jacob Milgrom. "How Not to Read the Bible: I am not for homosexuality, but I am for homosexuals. When the Bible is distorted to make God their enemy I must speak out to set the record straight." Bible Review. Volume 10 (number 2) (April 1994).
Jacob Milgrom. "The Most Basic Law in the Bible: It is easy to ‘love' the war-ravaged Bosnians, the AIDS-stricken Zaireans or the bereaved of Oklahoma City. But what of the strangers in our midst, the vagrants on our sidewalks?" Bible Review. Volume 11 (number 4) (August 1994).
Judith S. Antonelli. "Holiness." In In the Image of God: A Feminist Commentary on the Torah, pages 303–12. Northvale, New Jersey: Jason Aronson, 1995. .
Jacob Milgrom. "‘The Alien in Your Midst': Every nation has its ger: the permanent resident. The Torah commands us, first, not to oppress the ger, and then to befriend and love him." Bible Review. Volume 11 (number 6) (December 1995).
Ellen Frankel. The Five Books of Miriam: A Woman's Commentary on the Torah, pages 179–83. New York: G. P. Putnam's Sons, 1996. .
Marc Gellman. "Cutting Corners." In God's Mailbox: More Stories About Stories in the Bible, pages 80–84. New York: Morrow Junior Books, 1996. .
Jacob Milgrom. “The Changing Concept of Holiness in the Pentateuchal Codes with Emphasis on Leviticus 19.” In Reading Leviticus: A Conversation with Mary Douglas. Edited by J.F.A. Sawyer, pages 65–75. Sheffield: Sheffield Academic Press, 1996.
W. Gunther Plaut. The Haftarah Commentary, pages 292–98. New York: UAHC Press, 1996. .
Calum M. Carmichael. Law, Legend, and Incest in the Bible: Leviticus 18–20, pages 1–44, 62–198. Ithaca: Cornell University Press, 1997. .
Robert Goodman. “Shabbat.” In Teaching Jewish Holidays: History, Values, and Activities, pages 1–19. Denver: A.R.E. Publishing, 1997. .
Sorel Goldberg Loeb and Barbara Binder Kadden. Teaching Torah: A Treasury of Insights and Activities, pages 201–06. Denver: A.R.E. Publishing, 1997. .
Mary Douglas. Leviticus as Literature, pages 37, 42, 46, 84, 92, 99, 109, 123–24, 151, 156, 216, 231, 233, 237–40, 246, 250. Oxford: Oxford University Press, 1999. .
Susan Freeman. Teaching Jewish Virtues: Sacred Sources and Arts Activities, pages 179–94, 269–82, 319–46. Springfield, New Jersey: A.R.E. Publishing, 1999. . (17–18, 28, 32).
Robert S. Greenberger, "Motley Group Pushes for FDA Labels on Biofoods To Help Religious People Observe Dietary Laws," Wall Street Journal, August 18, 1999, page A20.

Adin Steinsaltz. Simple Words: Thinking About What Really Matters in Life, page 48. New York: Simon & Schuster, 1999. .
Rachel Esserman. "Who Shall Be Holy?" In The Women's Torah Commentary: New Insights from Women Rabbis on the 54 Weekly Torah Portions. Edited by Elyse Goldstein, pages 225–30. Woodstock, Vermont: Jewish Lights Publishing, 2000. .
Frank H. Gorman Jr. “Leviticus.” In The HarperCollins Bible Commentary. Edited by James L. Mays, pages 160–61. New York: HarperCollins Publishers, revised edition, 2000. .
Jacob Milgrom. Leviticus 17–22, volume 3A, pages 1594–790. New York: Anchor Bible, 2000. .
Joseph Telushkin. The Book of Jewish Values: A Day-by-Day Guide to Ethical Living, pages 4–6. New York: Bell Tower, 2000. .
Susan Ackerman. "When the Bible Enters the Fray: As Vermont legalizes civil unions for same-sex couples, both sides of the debate turn to the Bible for support. They might do better to turn to Bible scholars, too." Bible Review. Volume 16 (number 5) (October 2000): pages 6, 50.
Eyal Regev. “Priestly Dynamic Holiness and Deuteronomic Static Holiness.” Vetus Testamentum, volume 51 (number 2) (April 2001): pages 243–61.
Lainie Blum Cogan and Judy Weiss. Teaching Haftarah: Background, Insights, and Strategies, pages 435–43, 553–59. Denver: A.R.E. Publishing, 2002. .
Michael Fishbane. The JPS Bible Commentary: Haftarot, pages 183–92. Philadelphia: Jewish Publication Society, 2002. .
Tikva Frymer-Kensky. “To the Barricades: Views against the Other.” In Reading the Women of the Bible, pages 199–208. New York: Schocken Books, 2002. . ( on how the original inhabitants of the Land of Israel lost the land).
Gershon Hepner. “Abraham's Incestuous Marriage with Sarah a Violation of the Holiness Code.” Vetus Testamentum, volume 53 (number 2) (April 2003): pages 143–55.
Daniel S. Nevins. "The Participation of Jews Who Are Blind in the Torah Service." New York: Rabbinical Assembly, 2003.
Joseph Telushkin. The Ten Commandments of Character: Essential Advice for Living an Honorable, Ethical, Honest Life, pages 18, 32–34, 55–56, 129–32, 181–86, 259–62, 290–91, 300–04, 307–10. New York: Bell Tower, 2003. .
Robert Alter. The Five Books of Moses: A Translation with Commentary, pages 625–34. New York: W.W. Norton & Co., 2004. .
Jacob Milgrom. Leviticus: A Book of Ritual and Ethics: A Continental Commentary, pages 212–59. Minneapolis: Fortress Press, 2004. .
Baruch J. Schwartz. "Leviticus." In The Jewish Study Bible. Edited by Adele Berlin and Marc Zvi Brettler, pages 252–58. New York: Oxford University Press, 2004. .
Rona Shapiro. "Haftarat Kedoshim: Amos 9:7–15." In The Women's Haftarah Commentary: New Insights from Women Rabbis on the 54 Weekly Haftarah Portions, the 5 Megillot & Special Shabbatot. Edited by Elyse Goldstein, pages 138–40. Woodstock, Vermont: Jewish Lights Publishing, 2004. .
Antony Cothey. “Ethics and Holiness in the Theology of Leviticus.” Journal for the Study of the Old Testament, volume 30 (number 2) (December 2005): pages 131–51.
Professors on the Parashah: Studies on the Weekly Torah Reading Edited by Leib Moscovitz, pages 196–203. Jerusalem: Urim Publications, 2005. .
Bernard J. Bamberger. “Leviticus.” In The Torah: A Modern Commentary: Revised Edition. Edited by W. Gunther Plaut; revised edition edited by David E.S. Stern, pages 797–815. New York: Union for Reform Judaism, 2006. .
Jonathan P. Burnside. “Strange Flesh: Sex, Semiotics and the Construction of Deviancy in Biblical Law.” Journal for the Study of the Old Testament, volume 30 (number 4) (June 2006): pages 387–420.
Richard A. Allbee. “Asymmetrical Continuity of Love and Law between the Old and New Testaments: Explicating the Implicit Side of a Hermeneutical Bridge, Leviticus 19.11–18.” Journal for the Study of the Old Testament, volume 31 (number 2) (December 2006): pages 147–66.
Calum Carmichael. Illuminating Leviticus: A Study of Its Laws and Institutions in the Light of Biblical Narratives. Baltimore: Johns Hopkins University Press, 2006. .
Elliot N. Dorff, Daniel S. Nevins, and Avram I. Reisner. "Homosexuality, Human Dignity & Halakhah: A Combined Responsum for the Committee on Jewish Law And Standards." EH 24.2006b New York: Rabbinical Assembly, 2006.
Joel Roth. "Homosexuality Revisited." EH 24.2006a New York: Rabbinical Assembly, 2006.
Leonard Levy. "Same-Sex Attraction and Halakhah." EH 24.2006c New York: Rabbinical Assembly, 2006.
Baruch Frydman-Kohl. "You Have Wrestled with God and Human and Prevailed: Homosexuality and Halakhah." EH 24.2006d New York: Rabbinical Assembly, 2006.
Loel M. Weiss. "Same-Sex Attraction and Halakhah: A Concurring Opinion." EH 24.2006e New York: Rabbinical Assembly, 2006.
Myron Geller, Robert Fine and David Fine. "A New Context: The Halakhah of Same-Sex Relations." EH 24.2006f New York: Rabbinical Assembly, 2006.
Gordon Tucker. "Halakhic and Metahalakhic Arguments Concerning Judaism and Homosexuality." EH 24.2006g New York: Rabbinical Assembly, 2006.
Suzanne A. Brody. "Blood Is Life." In Dancing in the White Spaces: The Yearly Torah Cycle and More Poems, page 90. Shelbyville, Kentucky: Wasteland Press, 2007. .

James L. Kugel. How To Read the Bible: A Guide to Scripture, Then and Now, pages 19, 27, 131, 256, 261–62, 291–93, 295, 299, 302, 341, 609–10. New York: Free Press, 2007. .
Esther Jungreis. Life Is a Test, page 168. Brooklyn: Shaar Press, 2007. .
Alan Morinis. Everyday Holiness: The Jewish Spiritual Path of Mussar. Trumpeter, 2007. .
Patrick Stump, Pete Wentz, and Wesley Eisold (Fall Out Boy). "Golden." In Infinity on High. Island Records, 2007. (Golden Rule reference).
Christophe Nihan. From Priestly Torah to Pentateuch: A Study in the Composition of the Book of Leviticus. Coronet Books, 2007. .
The Torah: A Women's Commentary. Edited by Tamara Cohn Eskenazi and Andrea L. Weiss, pages 701–22. New York: URJ Press, 2008. .
Roland Boer. “The Forgetfulness of Julia Kristeva: Psychoanalysis, Marxism and the Taboo of the Mother.” Journal for the Study of the Old Testament, volume 33 (number 3) (March 2009): pages 259–76.
David Brodsky. “Sex in the Talmud: How to Understand Leviticus 18 and 20: Parashat Kedoshim (Leviticus 19:1–20:27).” In Torah Queeries: Weekly Commentaries on the Hebrew Bible. Edited by Gregg Drinkwater, Joshua Lesser, and David Shneer; foreword by Judith Plaskow, pages 157–69. New York: New York University Press, 2009. .
Roy E. Gane. "Leviticus." In Zondervan Illustrated Bible Backgrounds Commentary. Edited by John H. Walton, volume 1, pages 311–17. Grand Rapids, Michigan: Zondervan, 2009. .
Golden Rule: The Ethics of Reciprocity in World Religions. Edited by Jacob Neusner and Bruce D. Chilton. Continuum, 2009. .
Reuven Hammer. Entering Torah: Prefaces to the Weekly Torah Portion, pages 173–77. New York: Gefen Publishing House, 2009. .
Julie Cadwallader-Staub. Joy. In Face to Face: A Poetry Collection. DreamSeeker Books, 2010. . ("land of milk and honey").
Idan Dershowitz. “A Land Flowing with Fat and Honey.” Vetus Testamentum, volume 60 (number 2) (2010): pages 172–76.
Noach Dzmura. Balancing on the Mechitza: Transgender in Jewish Community. Berkeley, California: North Atlantic Books, 2010. .
Andrew Ramer, Camille Shira Angel, Dev Noily, and Jay Michaelson. Queering the Text: Biblical, Medieval, and Modern Jewish Stories. Maple Shade, New Jersey: White Crane Books, 2010. .
Hershel Schachter, Mordechai Willig, Michael Rosensweig, and Mayer Twersky. "Torah View on Homosexuality" (2010).
Jeffrey Stackert. “Leviticus.” In The New Oxford Annotated Bible: New Revised Standard Version with the Apocrypha: An Ecumenical Study Bible. Edited by Michael D. Coogan, Marc Z. Brettler, Carol A. Newsom, and Pheme Perkins, pages 170–73. New York: Oxford University Press, Revised 4th Edition 2010. .
Marjorie Ingall. "Shatnez Shock: Pondering One of the Torah's Woolliest Rules." Tablet Magazine. (July 19, 2010).
"Reporters' Roundtable: Sex and Sexuality Edition." In The Forward. (July 31, 2010). (podcast on Orthodox Judaism's attempts to address homosexuality).
Gal Beckerman. "Debate Over Homosexuality Now Roiling Orthodox Jews: Some Rabbis Reach Out to Gays, While Others Attempt a ‘Cure.'" In The Forward. (August 6, 2010).
Jay Michaelson. "Are Corporations Evil?" In The Forward. (August 6, 2010). (a proposal for requiring corporate public charity).
Stuart Lasine. “Everything Belongs to Me: Holiness, Danger, and Divine Kingship in the Post-Genesis World.” Journal for the Study of the Old Testament, volume 35 (number 1) (September 2010): pages 31–62.
Lawrence Rifkin. "The Times They Are A-Changin': Jewish Religious Attitudes Toward Homosexuality Are Slowly Shifting." The Jerusalem Report. Volume 21 (number 11) (September 13, 2010): pages 10–13.
Eliyahu Touger, translator. The Beard in Jewish Law: Halachic Imperative or Kabbalistic Stringency? Brooklyn: Ktav Publishing House, 2010..
Mark Washofsky. "Orthodox Minyan in a Reform Synagogue." In Reform Responsa for the Twenty-First Century, volume 1, page 3, page 4 note 4, page 11 note 4. New York: Central Conference of American Rabbis, 2010. . (application of the commandment "Love your neighbor" to an Orthodox Jew's request to conduct a minyan without women in a Reform synagogue).
Mark Washofsky. "The Second Festival Day and Reform Judaism."  In Reform Responsa for the Twenty-First Century, volume 1, pages 49, 54 note 30, 62–63 note 30. New York: Central Conference of American Rabbis, 2010. . (application of a revision of a ruling, takkanah, on produce from the fourth year to the question of whether a Reform synagogue may observe the second day of a Festival).
Mark Washofsky. "A ‘Proper' Reform Mikveh." In Reform Responsa for the Twenty-First Century, volume 1, page 89, page 93 note 21, page 98 note 21. New York: Central Conference of American Rabbis, 2010. . (application of the law of "Do not put a stumbling block before the blind" to the use of a non-Jewish ritual pool).
Mark Washofsky. "Circumcision for an Eight-Year-Old Convert."  In Reform Responsa for the Twenty-First Century, volume 1, pages 99, 101–05. New York: Central Conference of American Rabbis, 2010. . (noting that the Torah instructs to love the ger, and give the ger sustenance, but does not explicitly call for his circumcision).
Brad Embry. “The ‘Naked Narrative’ from Noah to Leviticus: Reassessing Voyeurism in the Account of Noah’s Nakedness in Genesis 9.22–24.” Journal for the Study of the Old Testament, volume 35 (number 4) (June 2011): pages 417–33..
Alexis Kashar. -not-curse-deaf “You shall Not Curse The Deaf.” The Jewish Week. (July 5, 2011).
William G. Dever. The Lives of Ordinary People in Ancient Israel: When Archaeology and the Bible Intersect, pages 178 note 43, 245. Grand Rapids, Michigan: William B. Eerdmans Publishing Company, 2012. .
Joe Lieberman and David Klinghoffer. The Gift of Rest: Rediscovering the Beauty of the Sabbath. New York: Howard Books, 2011. .
Jonathan Haidt. The Righteous Mind: Why Good People Are Divided by Politics and Religion, page 256. New York: Pantheon, 2012. . (prohibition of murder, adultery, false witness, and oath-breaking as an evolutionary advantage).

Shmuel Herzfeld. "Remembering the Besht." In Fifty-Four Pick Up: Fifteen-Minute Inspirational Torah Lessons, pages 169–74. Jerusalem: Gefen Publishing House, 2012. .
Daniel S. Nevins. "The Use of Electrical and Electronic Devices on Shabbat." New York: Rabbinical Assembly, 2012.
CCAR Responsa Committee. "Same-Sex Marriage as Kiddushin." 5774.4. (2013).
Adam Kirsch. "Ancient Laws for Modern Times: When is a tent just a tent and not like a bed or a hat? To update Jewish laws, the rabbis reasoned by analogy." Tablet Magazine. (February 26, 2013). (Shabbat).
Adam Kirsch. "Leave the Jewish People Alone: Rabbis left enforcement of their Talmudic decrees to communal standards and voluntary commitment." Tablet Magazine. (March 5, 2013). (Shabbat).
Adam Kirsch. "Written in the Stars (Or Not): To overcome fated lives, the Talmud's rabbis argued, perform virtuous acts according to Torah." Tablet Magazine. (March 12, 2013). (Shabbat).
Adam Kirsch. "Navigating the Talmud's Alleys: The range of problems and the variety of answers in the study of Oral Law lead to new pathways of reasoning." Tablet Magazine. (March 18, 2013). (Shabbat).
Marc Zvi Brettler. "Who's a Neighbor: Taken as a whole Kedoshim insists that all people must be ‘loved' — treated with fundamental respect and dignity." The Jerusalem Report. Volume 24 (number 2) (May 6, 2013): page 45.
Amiel Ungar. "Gay Marriage and the Jewish Question: A conscious decision not to produce Jewish descendants is lamentable and means that liberal Judaism will have fewer stakeholders in the future." The Jerusalem Report. Volume 24 (number 5) (June 17, 2013): page 22.
Adam Nagourney. "Gay Marriage Stirs Rebellion at Synagogue." The New York Times. (July 6, 2013): page A1.
Amiel Ungar. "Tel Aviv and the Sabbath." The Jerusalem Report. Volume 24 (number 8) (July 29, 2013): page 37.
Sam Schulman. "Same-Sex Marriage and the Jews." Mosaic Magazine. (February 2014).
Richard Elliott Friedman. "Love Your Neighbor: Only Israelites or Everyone?" Biblical Archaeology Review, volume 40 (number 5) (September/October 2014): pages 49–52.
Amanda Terkel. "Glenn Grothman, Wisconsin GOP Senator, Fights for a Seven-Day Workweek." The Huffington Post. (January 3, 2014, updated January 23, 2014). (Congressional candidate said, "Right now in Wisconsin, you're not supposed to work seven days in a row, which is a little ridiculous because all sorts of people want to work seven days a week.")
Ester Bloom. "The Crazy New App For Using Your iPhone on Shabbos."  Jewniverse. (October 1, 2014).
"The Crazy New Invention for Using Electricity on Shabbat."  Jewniverse. (April 21, 2015).
Shai Held. “Why Does the Torah Prohibit Cursing the Deaf?” Mosaic Magazine. (April 29, 2015).
Jodi Magness, “The Jewish Diaspora and the Golden Rule.” In Jesus and His Jewish Influences, lecture 6. Chantilly, Virginia: The Great Courses, 2015.

Jonathan Sacks. Covenant & Conversation: A Weekly Reading of the Jewish Bible: Leviticus: The Book of Holiness, pages 281–313. Jerusalem: Maggid Books, 2015. .
Jonathan Sacks. Lessons in Leadership: A Weekly Reading of the Jewish Bible, pages 157–61. New Milford, Connecticut: Maggid Books, 2015. .
David Booth, Ashira Konigsburg, and Baruch Frydman-Kohl. “Modesty Inside and Out: A Contemporary Guide to Tzniut,” page 7. New York: Rabbinical Assembly, 2016. ( and modesty in dress).
Jonathan Sacks. Essays on Ethics: A Weekly Reading of the Jewish Bible, pages 189–93. New Milford, Connecticut: Maggid Books, 2016. .
Shai Held. The Heart of Torah, Volume 2: Essays on the Weekly Torah Portion: Leviticus, Numbers, and Deuteronomy, pages 57–65. Philadelphia: Jewish Publication Society, 2017. .
Steven Levy and Sarah Levy. The JPS Rashi Discussion Torah Commentary, pages 97–99. Philadelphia: Jewish Publication Society, 2017. .
Pekka Pitkänen. “Ancient Israelite Population Economy: Ger, Toshav, Nakhri and Karat as Settler Colonial Categories.” Journal for the Study of the Old Testament, volume 42 (number 2) (December 2017): pages 139–53.
Leonard A. Sharzer. “Transgender Jews and Halakhah.” New York: Rabbinical Assembly, 2017.
Idan Dershowitz. “The Secret History of Leviticus.” The New York Times, July 21, 2018. ( and ).
Bill Dauster. "Who Is Our Neighbor?" Washington Jewish Week, May 9, 2019, page 28.
Julia Rhyder. "Sabbath and Sanctuary Cult in the Holiness Legislation: A Reassessment." Journal of Biblical Literature, volume 138, number 4 (2019): pages 721–40.
John J. Collins. “Love Your Neighbor: How It Became the Golden Rule.” TheTorah.com. 2020.

External links

Texts
Masoretic text and 1917 JPS translation
Hear the parashah chanted 
Hear the parashah read in Hebrew

Commentaries
Aish.com 
Bar-Ilan University
Chabad.org
Jewish Theological Seminary
MyJewishLearning.com
Ohr Sameach
OzTorah, Torah from Australia
Professor James L. Kugel
Rabbi Dov Linzer
Rabbi Jonathan Sacks
RabbiShimon.com 
Tanach Study Center
Teach613.org, Torah Education at Cherry Hill
Torah from Dixie 
Torah.org
TorahVort.com
Union for Reform Judaism

Weekly Torah readings in Iyar
Weekly Torah readings in Nisan
Weekly Torah readings from Leviticus
Sexuality in the Bible